The Col d'Aubisque (elevation ) is a mountain pass in the Pyrenees  south of Tarbes and Pau in the department of the Pyrénées-Atlantiques, in the Aquitaine region of France.

The pass is on the northern slopes of the Pic de Ger and connects Laruns, in the valley of the Gave d'Ossau, via Eaux-Bonnes (west) to Argelès-Gazost, in the valley of the Gave de Pau, via the Col du Soulor (east). The road crosses the Cirque du Litor, in the upper part of the Ouzom valley. It is generally closed from December to June.

The pass is starting point of excursions and a centre for winter sports. In summer, it is popular with cyclists. It is regularly part of the Tour de France, generally rated an hors catégorie climb.

The col
The summit of the col is marked by a commemorative plaque to André Bach (1888–1945), a member of Legion of Honour and President of the Cyclo Club of Béarn (C.C.B.). André Bach was mutilated during World War 1 when he lost his left arm in 1916. In 1943 he was deported to the Buchenwald concentration camp in Germany, and he died in May 1945 at Boulay-Moselle while returning home. The stele was inaugurated on 26 September 1948, and every year is the focus of a memorial ride.

The inscription reads:
André Bach 1888–1945
Officier de la Légion d'honneur
Grand mutilé – Président du C.C.B. – Mort en Déportation
Pour perpétuer son souvenir en ce lieu qu'il aimait tant 
Ses amis Les Cyclotouristes du C.C.B.  1948

Details of the climb 

From the west, the climb to the Aubisque starts in Laruns. The first few kilometres, to the spa resort of Eaux-Bonnes, are fairly easy. After the Cascade de Valentin comes a section at 13%.

The east side is climbed after the Col du Soulor. It rises , an average gradient of 5.2%. It gets tougher after Arrens-Marsous with 10% and more. The road from the Soulor runs along cliffs in the Cirque du Litor, where there are two short, narrow tunnels.

Writing in  Vélo, Gilbert Duclos-Lassalle said:
The Aubisque is one of those hors catégorie cols that make the legend of the Tour. The climb is in three parts. The first is fairly easy. The road is good and the specialists use 39 × 19 or 53 × 21. Then, at Eaux-Bonnes, you turn left and get to the real climb. This part, as far as Gourette, is a lot more difficult. The hardest part swings between eight and ten per cent from the seventh kilometre until Pont-du-Goua at the ninth kilometre and you need 39 × 21. Then, after 300m of flat in Gourette, a hairpin goes up to the Hôtel des Crêtes Blanches. Riders use 39 × 17 over four kilometres before going into 39 × 16 in the last two kilometres.

Tour de France 

The Col d'Aubisque appeared in the Tour de France in 1910, crossed by François Lafourcade. It has appeared frequently since then, more than once every two years. It was included at the insistence of Alphone Steinès, a colleague of Henri Desgrange at the Tour de France. Steinès visited the man responsible for local roads, the ingénieur des ponts-et-chaussées, who said: "Take the riders up the Aubisque? You're completely crazy in Paris." Steinès agreed that the Tour would pay 5,000 francs to clear the pass. Desgrange knocked the price down to 2,000.

In 1951, Wim van Est was in the yellow jersey – the first Dutchman to wear it and chasing the leaders towards the Soulor when he slipped on gravel and fell into a ravine. He said:
That first bend was wet, slippery from the snow. And there were sharp stones on the road that the cars had kicked up, and my front wheel hit them and I went over. Well, there was a drop of 20m. They've built a barrier there now but then there was nothing to stop you going over. I fell 20 metres, rolling and rolling and rolling. My feet had come out of the straps, my bike had disappeared, and there was a little flat area, the only one that's there, no bigger than the seat of a chair, and I landed on my backside. A metre left or right and I'd have dropped onto solid stone, six or seven hundred metres down. My ankles were all hurt, my elbows were kaput. I was all bruised and shaken up and I didn't know where I was, but nothing was broken.

The team's manager, Kees Pellenaars, took a tow rope from the Dutch team's car. It was too short to reach van Est and so to it he tied 40 racing tyres, and thus he was pulled out. Van Est said: "It was all the tyres that Pellenaars had for the team. By the time they'd tugged me up, they were all stretched and they wouldn't stay on the wheels any more! Forty tyres! I wanted to get back on my bike and start racing again. But I couldn't. Pellenaars stopped the whole team."

Van Est told journalists: "I had the feeling that I was taking that bend badly but I so much wanted to keep the yellow jersey, so I went flat out and off I flew. A monument spot 50 years later, on 17 July 2001, says: "Here on 17 July 1951 the cyclist Wim van Est fell 70 metres. He survived but lost the yellow jersey." A newspaper advertisement in the Netherlands showed van Est displaying the watch that he'd worn, with the legend: "My heart stopped, but not my Pontiac."

Tour de France stage finishes 
Stage 16 of the 2007 Tour de France finished at the summit of the Aubisque. There has been one previous finish at the summit (in 1985). In 1971, stage 16a finished at Gourette on the western approaches to Aubisque.

Rasmussen won stage 16 in 2007, confirming himself as favourite for victory in Paris, but that evening was sacked by his team and thrown off the race.

Passages in the Tour de France (since 1947) 
There have been 47 passages over the summit since 1947, making it the second most visited mountain in the race's history.

Vuelta a España

Vuelta a España stage finishes 
Stage 14 of the 2016 Vuelta a España finished at the summit of the Aubisque.

See also
 Souvenir Henri Desgrange

References

External links 

 Aubisque bicycle climb description excerpt from "Best Cycling Routes of the Pyrenees" 
 Cycling Col d'Ausbique and the History of the Tour de France photos, video and report.
Details of climbs
Complete list of Tour de France appearances
Col d'Aubisque on Google Maps (Tour de France classic climbs)

Mountain passes of Nouvelle-Aquitaine
Mountain passes of the Pyrenees
Climbs in cycle racing in France